In mathematics, the term exact equation can refer either of the following:

Exact differential equation
Exact differential form